Album 1700 is the seventh studio album by American folk music trio Peter, Paul and Mary, released in 1967. It produced the band's most successful and final hit, a cover of the John Denver composition "Leaving on a Jet Plane". The album peaked at number 15 on Billboard magazine's Top LP chart and was nominated for a Grammy Award in the Best Folk Performance category. Album 1700 was so named because its original LP issue was Warner Bros. Records catalog number W-1700 for the mono version and WS-1700 for the stereo version. It stayed on the charts and rose again in 1969, thanks to the single release of "Leaving on a Jet Plane".

The song "I'm in Love with a Big Blue Frog" was written by Leslie Braunstein, who was the original lead singer of Soft White Underbelly, the band that became Blue Öyster Cult. The song was later adapted into a children's book and covered by Will Ryan and Phil Baron on the Disney children's album Goin' Quackers.

Cover art 
The cover is styled after one of the promotional photographs for the movie Bonnie and Clyde that showed the gang holding machine guns. It was taken at 70 Bedford Street, Greenwich Village, New York City.

Track listing 
Side 1
 "Rolling Home" (Eric Andersen) – 3:31
 "Leaving on a Jet Plane" (John Denver) – 3:30
 "Weep for Jamie" (Peter Yarrow)– 4:12
 "No Other Name" (Paul Stookey) – 2:31
 "The House Song" (Paul Stookey, Robert Bannard) – 4:18
 "The Great Mandella (The Wheel of Life)" (Peter Yarrow) – 4:45
Side 2
 "I Dig Rock and Roll Music" (Paul Stookey, James Mason, Dave Dixon) – 2:33
 "If I Had Wings" (Peter Yarrow, Susan Yardley) – 2:22
 "I'm in Love with a Big Blue Frog" (Leslie Braunstein) – 2:08
 "Whatshername" (Paul Stookey, Dave Dixon, Richard Kniss) – 3:27
 "Bob Dylan's Dream" (Bob Dylan) – 4:01
 "The Song Is Love" (Dave Dixon, Richard Kniss, Paul Stookey, Peter Yarrow, Mary Travers) – 2:44

Personnel 
Peter, Paul & Mary
 Peter Yarrow – vocals; solo vocal on "If I Had Wings"; guitar; 12-string guitar on "Leaving on a Jet Plane" and "Weep for Jamie"
 Noel "Paul" Stookey – vocals; solo vocal on "Whatshername"; guitar; 12-string guitar on "Rolling Home", "The House Song" and "The Song Is Love"
 Mary Travers  – vocals; solo vocal on "No Other Name"
with:
 Howard Collins - guitar
 Paul Griffin  - organ on "Weep for Jamie"
 Morris Wechslier - piano
 Harvey Brooks - bass
 Richard Kniss - wood bass solo on "Whatshername"
 Russ Savakus - bass
 Paul Butterfield - harmonica on "Rolling Home"
 Chuck Beale (The Paupers)  - guitar
 Adam Mitchell (The Paupers) - guitar
 Denny Gerrard (The Paupers) - bass
 Skip Prokop (The Paupers) - drums
 Gene Bertoncini (Paul Winter Consort) - guitar on "The House Song"
 Karl Herreshoff (Paul Winter Consort) - guitar on "The House Song"
 John Beal (Paul Winter Consort) - bass on "The House Song"
 Gene Murrow (Paul Winter Consort) - English horn on "The House Song"
 Paul Winter (Paul Winter Consort) - saxophone on "The House Song"
 Virgil Scott (Paul Winter Consort) - alto flute on "The House Song"
 Richard Bock (Paul Winter Consort) - cello on "The House Song"

Production notes
 Milton Okun – producer
 Phil Ramone – engineer
 Don Hahn – associate engineer

Chart positions

References 

Peter, Paul and Mary albums
1967 albums
Warner Records albums
Albums produced by Albert Grossman
Albums produced by Milt Okun